Francis Carpenter may refer to:
Francis Bicknell Carpenter (1830–1900), American painter
Francis M. Carpenter (1834–1919), American politician
Francis W. Carpenter (1831–1922), American businessman
Francis Carpenter (actor) (1910–1973), American actor

See also

Frances Carpenter (1890–1972),  American folklorist, author, and photographer
Frances Carpenter, Countess of Tyrconnel, Irish countess
Frank Carpenter (disambiguation)